

The Seward Park Campus is a "vertical campus" of the New York City Department of Education located at 350 Grand Street at the corner of Essex Street, in the Lower East Side/Cooperative Village neighborhoods of Manhattan, New York City.  It was the location of the former Seward Park High School, a now-closed comprehensive high school.

The school began as P.S. 62 Intermediate, an intermediate school.  In 1923 the school pursued an experimental path as a combined junior-senior high school.  Two years later, it transformed to a strictly senior high school, with Robert Brodie serving as its first high school principal. Owing to construction of the New York City Subway's IND Sixth Avenue Line, the school was relocated to the site of a courthouse and the Ludlow Street Jail. The new building was completed in 1929.

The school experienced a decline in performance and graduated its last class in June 2006.  The building now houses five different small schools: the High School for Dual Language and Asian Studies, New Design High School, the Essex Street Academy — formerly the High School for History and Communication, the Lower Manhattan Arts Academy, and the Urban Assembly Academy of Government and Law.  The small schools showed graduation rates which were much improved over that of the old comprehensive school.  Seward Park High School's graduation rate in 2001 was 32%, while the graduation rates of the smaller schools in 2012 were:

High School for Dual Language and Asian Studies – 92.5%
Lower Manhattan arts Academy – 80%
Urban Assembly Academy of Government and Law – 79.3%
New Design High School – 79.1%
Essex Street Academy – 76.5%

The campus offers programs on Saturdays where students can come in and participate in activities such as SAT prep, cooking, and Open Gym. The school refers to this program as the "Super Saturday Program".

The campuses' Varsity Sports teams are nicknamed the Seward Park Bears, They participate in the PSAL Division A Athletics. Boys' sports include Baseball, Basketball, Volleyball, Handball, Bowling, and Badminton. While girls sports include Basketball, Softball, Volleyball, Tennis, Bowling, Badminton. Each individual school in the campus has a junior varsity basketball team which are very competitive.

Notable alumni

Edwin Almonte, former pitcher for the New York Mets
Julius Axelrod, Nobel Prize winner
Anna Berger, actress
Lou Bernstein, photographer (did not graduate)
Kevin S. Bright, producer and director 
Sammy Cahn, entertainer
Vince Camuto, founder of Nine West
Tony Curtis, actor
Roberto Durán, former pitcher for the Detroit Tigers
Mickey Freeman, actor
Bonnie Garcia, politician and the first Hispanic woman to represent the 80th assembly district of California
Estelle Getty, entertainer
David Gordon, postmodern dancer, choreographer and director
Luis Guzmán, actor
Jane Katz, Olympic long distance swimmer
Johnny Marines, manager of the former group Aventura and current manager of Bachata star Romeo Santos
Walter Matthau, actor
Zero Mostel, actor
Ken McFadden, basketball player, led Cleveland St. to a Cinderella run to the Elite 8 in 1986. 'The Mouse'
Selwyn Raab, journalist, author, and former investigative reporter for The New York Times.
Julius Rosenberg, executed spy
Joe E. Ross, comic television actor (did not graduate)
Thomas Satch Sanders, basketball Hall of Famer
Jerry Stiller, actor, comedian
Aida Turturro, actress
Stu Ungar, poker player (dropped out, did not graduate)
Keenen Ivory Wayans, actor, comedian

See also

References
Notes

Sources

External links

Seward Park High School Alumni Association
High School for Dual Language and Asian Studies | HSDLAS

Defunct high schools in Manhattan
New York City Department of Education
Educational institutions established in 1929
Lower East Side
1929 establishments in New York City